Val-Cenis is a commune in the department of Savoie, southeastern France. The municipality was established on 1 January 2017 by merger of the former communes of Termignon (the seat), Bramans, Lanslebourg-Mont-Cenis, Lanslevillard and Sollières-Sardières.

Geography

Climate

Val-Cenis has a subarctic climate (Köppen climate classification Dfc).

Gallery

See also 
Communes of the Savoie department

References 

Communes of Savoie